Éditions Albin Michel is a French publisher. In January 2022, the new director is Anna Pavlowitch, the daughter of Paul Pavlowitch, Romain Gary and Jean Seberg's nephew.

History
It was founded in 1900 by Albin Michel. They published, first, Romain Rolland, Henri Barbusse, Roland Dorgelès, Henri Pourrat, Vercors, Robert Sabatier, and Didier Van Cauwelaert, Éric-Emmanuel Schmitt, Daphne du Maurier, Mary Higgins Clark, Stephen King or Thomas Harris.

Critics
In 2016, Le Monde criticized the publication of far-right authors as Éric Zemmour, Philippe de Villiers, Patrick Buisson. Robert Ménard, also published by the house and identified as far-right mayor, denounced a bad economic strategy to cancel their contract with Zemmour running for the 2022 French presidential election.

Authors
 Ramona Badescu
 Philip K. Dick
 Louis Lavelle
 Emmanuelle Ménard
 Robert Ménard
 Éric Naulleau
 Irène Némirovsky
 Amélie Nothomb
 Michel Onfray
 Maxence Van Der Meersch
 Philippe de Villiers
 David Walliams
 Bernard Werber, Exit
 Jean-Pierre Willem
 Éric Zemmour

Collections
 Maîtres de la littérature étrangère

See also
 Books in France

References

External links

 Official Website

Editions Albin Michel
French companies established in 1900
French brands